Vlad Dascălu (born 17 December 1997) is a Romanian cross-country mountain biker.

Dascălu began cycling at the age of 14 with downhill competitions, before switching to cross country.

Major results

2018
 1st  Cross-country, National Championships
 UCI Under-23 XCO World Cup
1st Nové Město
2019
 1st  Cross-country, UCI World Under-23 Championships
 1st  Cross-country, UEC European Under-23 Championships
 1st  Cross-country, National Championships
 1st  Overall UCI Under-23 XCO World Cup
1st Nové Město
1st Vallnord
1st Les Gets
1st Val di Sole
2021
 1st  Cross-country, National Championships
 UCI XCO World Cup
2nd Snowshoe
2022
 UCI XCO World Cup
2nd Nové Město
3rd Petrópolis
3rd Albstadt
 UCI XCC World Cup
2nd Leogang
2nd Snowshoe
3rd Vallnord

References

1997 births
Living people
Romanian male cyclists
People from Fălticeni
UCI Mountain Bike World Champions (men)
Cross-country mountain bikers
Cyclists at the 2020 Summer Olympics
Olympic cyclists of Romania